Olivier Galzi (born 26 October 1971) is a French journalist.

He works for the French TV network France 2, a division of France Télévisions. On France 2, Galzi presents news bulletins within Télématin, France 2's morning show presented weekdays at 7:00 and 8:00 CET in Metropolitan France. Galzi is also the regular substitute for David Pujadas on the station's evening news bulletin 20 heures. He sometimes presents the newscasts in Canada on TV5 every 1/2 hour (4 times over 2 hours, starting shortly before the hour and 1/2 past the hour) from 6:00 to 8:00am North American Eastern Time.

In August 2010 Galzi left France Télévisions to run the breakfast show La Matinale de L'Info from 6am to 9am each weekday on i-Télé, alongside the newsreader Amandine Bégot.

On 2011, Denis Girolami joined i-Télé from RTL and replaced Galzi, so he took charge on a new show: L'Édition du Soir every weekend from 6pm to midnight.

From 10/2011 to 9/2012, Galzi presented a magazine about presidential election, called CQFD – Ce qu'il fallait décrypter, every Saturday from 10:15am to 11am.

On 9/2012, he started presenting La Grande Édition from 10pm to midnight each weekday with Maya Lauqué.

From 2016 to 7/2017, he anchors Galzi Jusqu'à Minuit - Le Grand Décryptage, which running Monday–Thursday from 9:00pm to midnight.

On 7/2017, he left CNews.

References

External links
 

1971 births
Living people
French television journalists
People from Tunis
Tunisian emigrants to France